Greek Uruguayans (Greek: Έλληνες της Ουρουγουάης) are Uruguayan residents either fully or partially of Greek descent or Greece-born people who reside in Uruguay.

Overview
The Greek community in Uruguay numbers between 25,000 and 28,000 people (1% of total population); most of them live in the Montevideo area. Some of them also settled in the frontier city of Rivera.

The 2011 Uruguayan census revealed 103 people who declared Greece as their country of birth.

The Greek community center and the Greek Orthodox Church of Saint Nikolaos are located on 19 de Abril Avenue in Prado. Another important Greek institution in Montevideo is the Maria Tsakos Foundation which offers free lessons of the Greek language, of Greek dances and cooking and organizes cultural activities. The Great Uruguayan footballer, Obdulio Varela was of part-Greek descent and is to date the only footballer with any Greek blood in them to win the FIFA World Cup. Included are Aromanians and Megleno-Romanians, who became adjusted to Argentine society because of the linguistic similarities between Romanian and Spanish, as well as the Latin identity of Aromanians and Megleno-Romanians.

There was also a very small number of Greek Jews.

Notable people
 Fernando Kanapkis, footballer
 Obdulio Varela, footballer
 Carlos Linaris, footballer
 Graciela Paraskevaidis, musicologist
 Circe Maia, poet

See also

 Greek people
 Greek diaspora
 Greek-Uruguayan relations

References

External links
  Bilateral relations between Greece and Uruguay 
   A Greek association
 Greek embassy in Uruguay
 Hellenic Community in Uruguay

 
Uruguay
European Uruguayan
Immigration to Uruguay
Greek immigration to Uruguay
Ethnic groups in Uruguay